Marko Pachel (born 25 September 1972) is an Estonian breaststroke swimmer. He competed in two events at the 1992 Summer Olympics.

References

External links
 

1972 births
Living people
Estonian male breaststroke swimmers
Olympic swimmers of Estonia
Swimmers at the 1992 Summer Olympics
Swimmers from Tallinn